Coccothrinax elegans is a palm which is endemic to Cuba.

Henderson and colleagues (1995) considered C. elegans to be a synonym of Coccothrinax miraguama.

References

elegans
Trees of Cuba
Plants described in 1981